Jediah Morgan (born 30 November 1999) is an Australian professional golfer who currently plays on the PGA Tour of Australasia and LIV Golf League. He won the Fortinet Australian PGA Championship in 2022 and also won the 2021–22 PGA Tour of Australasia Order of Merit.

Amateur career
In January 2020, Morgan won the Australian Amateur, beating Northern Irishman Tom McKibbin 5 and 3 in the final.

Professional career
Morgan turned professional in October 2021. He finished second in the inaugural Sandbelt Invitational in December 2021, finishing six shots behind Brady Watt.

In January 2022, Morgan won the Fortinet Australian PGA Championship, in just his fourth start as a professional. He won by a record eleven shots ahead of Andrew Dodt and also broke the aggregate scoring record with a total of 262. He also became the youngest winner in the tournament's history. With this win, it was good enough to see Morgan claim the PGA Tour of Australasia Order of Merit for the 2021–22 season.

Amateur wins
2016 NSW Junior State Championship
2017 NT Amateur, Singapore Junior Championship, Queensland Boys Amateur, NSW Junior State Championship
2020 Australian Amateur

Source:

Professional wins (1)

PGA Tour of Australasia wins (1)

Results in major championships

CUT = missed the half-way cut

Team appearances
Australian Men's Interstate Teams Matches (representing Queensland): 2017, 2018, 2019

Source:

References

External links

Australian male golfers
PGA Tour of Australasia golfers
LIV Golf players
1999 births
Living people